National Feng-Hsin Senior High School, alias Feng-Hsin Senior High School, abbreviated as FHSH is a high school located in southern Fengshan District, Kaohsiung City, Taiwan, established by the education ministry of Taiwan in order to satisfy the growing need of education in Kaohsiung City owing to soaring number of population in 1992. It has 19 classes for each grades comprising three special classes, namely musical class, art class, and mathematical and science centered class.

See also
National Fengshan Senior High School

References

High schools in Taiwan
Schools in Kaohsiung
Educational institutions established in 1992
1992 establishments in Taiwan